"Girls Want Girls" is a song by Canadian rapper Drake featuring American rapper Lil Baby. It is the third track on the former's sixth studio album Certified Lover Boy, released on September 3, 2021, and sent to rhythmic contemporary radio on September 28, 2021, as the album's second official single.
The R&B and trap song, written alongside producers Oz and Ambezza, is about the artists being attracted to lesbians. It received mixed to negative reviews, with critics praising it as catchy but criticizing the lyrics as confusing and fetishistic. Criticisms were also levelled against lyrics about Drake being a lesbian himself, which critics considered immature. It peaked at number two on the UK Singles Chart, the ARIA Singles Chart, and the Billboard Hot 100, matching "Wants and Needs", another Drake and Lil Baby collaboration, as the latter's highest charting song on the latter chart.

Composition

"Girls Want Girls" is a downtempo, melodic R&B and trap song which contains interpolations of Drake's song "Time Flies". It was produced by Oz and Ambezza and features vocals from Lil Baby. It is the fifth collaboration between Drake and Lil Baby, after "Yes Indeed", "Never Recover", "Wants and Needs", and the remix of Future's "Life Is Good" also featuring DaBaby.  On the song, Drake raps about being attracted to lesbians, and about attempting to seduce a homosexual woman by claiming that he is also a lesbian, rapping, "Yeah, say that you a lesbian, girl, me too". The Guardians Alim Kheraj wrote that the song was "either about a night out picking up women with a lesbian friend or...[the] insinuation that [Drake] could 'turn' a queer woman".

Reception
Variety included the song in their list of the worst songs of 2021. Pitchforks Matthew Strauss called "Girls Want Girls" a "pleasant, classic Drake moment", while Brandon Yu of Variety described it as "infectiously moody". Billboards Carl Lamarre ranked the song eighth out of the 21 songs on Certified Lover Boy, calling it a "catchy earworm" and an "instant classic" with a "sticky hook", also complimenting Lil Baby's "frenzied delivery". The A.V. Clubs Nina Hernandez opined that the song "has everything you need in a next-gen pop hit" and praised the song for its "catchy" hook, Lil Baby's "effortless" verse, and its appreciation of lesbians. William Rosebury of The Line of Best Fit wrote that "Girls Want Girls" was one of several songs on Certified Lover Boy that followed the "classic Drake formula" of having "nocturnal and soulful" production and "melodic", "stream-of-consciousness" lyrics, which had "countless quotables and yet little to no depth". 

Jon Caramanica of The New York Times described "Girls Want Girls" as "silly", while Clashs Nathan Evans called the song a "dud" that "welcome[s] in the familiar malaise of a Drake project", adding that Lil Baby's verse takes the song's concept "well beyond its limit". The Guardians Alim Kheraj called the song "confusing and meandering", while Slant Magazines Charles Lyons-Burt described it as "nonsensical". The Ringers Josh Milton of PinkNews wrote that the song was proof that "straight men never know where to draw the line". For the Financial Times, Ludovic Hunter-Tilney wrote that "Drake's sexism becomes ludicrous" on the song; Times Cady Lang identified "Girls Want Girls" as "the most overt instance" of Drake's "no-longer-so subtle misogyny", adding that he fetishizes lesbians on the song. Craig Jenkins of Vulture stated that Drake "serves reheated lesbian jokes" on the song.

Much of the criticism toward the song was levelled against a lyric in which Drake raps about being a lesbian. Sam Moore of The Independent wrote that the lyric was the worst punchline on the album, calling it "rote" and "so grating even Eminem would balk at [it]", adding that it fetishized bisexuality. Elamin Abdelmahmoud of BuzzFeed News wrote that the line was "god-awful" and delivered with "the charm of a middle-aged dad in the club". Writing for NME, Rhian Daly described it as "cringe-y as fuck" and "the kind of thing kids think is smart when they've just hit puberty", adding that it was "just tragic" coming from a 34-year-old man.  Pitchforks Matthew Strauss also wrote that Drake rapped the line "like the cleverest little boy at sleepaway camp", with Ludovic Hunter-Tilney deeming the line an "absurd claim". Jon Caramanica remarked that the "deep-sigh" line was aimed at "those in search of a cheap wink". Charles Holmes of The Ringer called it a "cringe pickup line that no cisgendered man has ever sold throughout recorded history". Listeners also expressed their confusion about the lyric on social media.

Commercial performance
"Girls Want Girls" debuted at number two on the Billboard Hot 100, earning 57.4 million streams and 1.5 million in airplay audience and selling 3,000 copies in its first week. The song matches "Wants and Needs", another Drake and Lil Baby collaboration, as the latter's highest-charting song. In its second week on the chart, it fell eight spots to number 10. The song also peaked at number two in the UK and in Australia, and at number three on the Billboard Global 200 chart.

Charts

Weekly charts

Year-end charts

Certifications

Release history

References

2021 singles
2021 songs
Drake (musician) songs
Lil Baby songs
Lesbian-related songs
Songs written by Drake (musician)
Songs written by Lil Baby
Songs written by Oz (record producer)